The Table of Opposites ( sustoichia) of Pythagoras is the oldest surviving of many such tables propounded by philosophers.  Aristotle is the main source of our knowledge of the Pythagorean table.

Here follows a rough translation of the Table of Opposites, although like all translations the precise meaning does not necessarily carry over from the original Greek. For example, "crooked" has connotations in English that it may lack in the original.

 finite, infinite
 odd, even
 one, many
 male, female 
 right, left
 rest, motion
 straight, crooked
 light, darkness
 good, evil
 square, oblong (one of these two, could be: ROUND or OVAL (because every square is oblong))

Of these ten opposites, many philosophers have seized on the third pair as one of the most profound questions in philosophy, like "Is the universe one? Then how is it diverse? Is the universe many?  Then how is it unified?" This has historically been known as the problem of the one and the many, about which no small amount of ink has been spilled.

See also
Systole and Diastole
 Pythagoreanism

References

Pythagorean philosophy
Dichotomies